The Turkhel is a  tribe found in the Mianwali District of Punjab, Pakistan.

History and origin
According to 1911 census the Turkhel were the principal  clan in district by population. According to traditions, the Turkhel were originally descendants of slaves. The word Khel in Pashto means tribe and Tur means Black.

Like other tribes of the district, they are trilingual, speaking Pashto, Punjabi (along with Siraiki language) and Urdu. According to 1901 census during British Raj, they numbered about 250.

Distribution

They are mainly found in the towns of Kalabagh and Marri Indus, in the Isakhel Tehsil of Mianwali District.

Many have now migrated to Karachi, and are involved in transportation business in the city.

References 

Social groups of Pakistan
Niazi Pashtun tribes
Punjabi tribes
Saraiki tribes
Pashto-language surnames
Saraiki-language surnames
Pakistani names
Surnames